James Taylor Stratton (1844 – July 17, 1918) was an American politician who served in the Virginia House of Delegates.

References

External links 

Democratic Party members of the Virginia House of Delegates
19th-century American politicians
1844 births
1918 deaths